Showtime is the seventh studio album by American musician James Brown. The album was released in April 1964, by Smash Records. It was the transition album from King Records to Smash Records, however, limited by contractual obligations with King Records, Brown released an album of remakes overdubbed with canned applause. Brown's vocal group, The Famous Flames are included in the album's introduction, are featured on the album's cover, and are featured on several of the album's tracks including "Don't Cry Baby", "Out of the Blue" and "Caldonia". The album was arranged by Sammy Lowe.

In mid 2018, some 54 years after its original 1964 release on vinyl, this album, Showtime by James Brown & The Famous Flames, was released on CD for the first time.

Track listing

References

External links 
 James Brown - Showtime (1964) album review by Andrew Hamilton, credits & releases at AllMusic
 James Brown - Showtime (1964) album releases & credits at Discogs
 James Brown - Showtime (1964) album to be listened as stream on Spotify

James Brown albums
1964 albums
Smash Records albums
The Famous Flames albums